Diab is a village in Togo.

Diab may also refer to:

People

Given name
Diab (actor) (born 1979), Egyptian actor
Diab al-Mashi (1915–2009), Syrian politician and member of the parliament

Surname
Ahmed Diab (born 1954), Egyptian fencer
Ali Diab (born 1982), Syrian professional association football (soccer) player
Amr Diab (born 1961), Egyptian pan-Arab singer
Elias Diab, Lebanese photographer 
George Diab, Lebanese actor and voice actor.
Hassan Diab (sociologist) (born 1953), Lebanese-Canadian sociology lecturer who was arrested in suspicion with a 1980 bombing in Paris synagogue
Hassan Diab (born 1959), Lebanese engineer, academic, minister and Prime Minister of Lebanon
Lena Diab, Canadian politician
Marc Diab (1986–2009), killed Canadian soldier of Lebanese origin, subject of documentary If I Should Fall
Maya Diab (born 1980), Lebanese singer and actress
Miguel Diab (born 1920), Uruguayan basketball player
Najeeb Diab (1870–1936), an early Arab nationalist and publisher
Mohamed Diab, Egyptian film director
Rashid Diab (born 1957), Sudanese painter
Roseanne Diab, South African academic 
Sima Diab (born 1979), Syrian-American photographer 
Yussef Diab (1917–1984), Israeli Arab politician who served as a member of the Knesset
Hussein Diab (born 1964), mayor of Aleppo

Other uses
Dataindustrier AB, or DIAB, a Swedish computer firm

See also
Ain Diab, a commune located at the Corniche of Casablanca, Morocco
Ain-Diab Circuit, was a Formula One road circuit built in 1957, south west of Ain-Diab in Morocco
Dib (name)
Diyap Yıldırım (1852–1932), also known as Diyap Ağa, Turkish politician and tribal leader
Hanna Diyab, Syrian Maronite writer and storyteller

Arabic-language surnames